The United Press International Athlete of the Year Award was conferred annually between 1974 and 1995, one each to the individuals adjudged, without restriction to nationality or sport contested, to be the male and female athlete of the year by a panel of sportswriters and editors constituted under the auspices of the United Press International.

Male winners

Female winners

Notes

See also
Athlete of the Year
Associated Press Athlete of the Year
Best Female Athlete ESPY Award
Best Male Athlete ESPY Award
Sporting News Sportsman/Pro Athlete of the Year
Sports Illustrated Sportsman of the Year
Laureus World Sports Award for Sportsman of the Year (Laureus World Sports Academy)
Laureus World Sports Award for Sportswoman of the Year
BBC Overseas Sports Personality of the Year
L'Équipe Champion of Champions Award

References
Brown, Gerry, and Morrison, Michael (eds.; 2003).  ESPN Information Please Sports Almanac.  New York City: ESPN Books and Hyperion (joint).  .

External links
Enumeration of award winners by HickokSports.com

Sports trophies and awards
Awards established in 1974
Awards disestablished in 1996